Knockaloe Internment Camp was a WWI internment camp on the Isle of Man, at Knockaloe Farm in the parish of Patrick, near Peel, which housed 23,000 prisoners-of-war and 3,000 guards between 1914 and 1919. It was served by the Knockaloe railway station and branch line.

Knockaloe Farm in Patrick, Isle of Man had been used for military training, and in November 1914 was opened as a purpose-built internment camp.

Notable people
George Kenner
Joseph Pilates
John Quayle-Dickson, sub-commandant

References

External links

Internment camps in the Isle of Man
World War I internment camps